Mycopan is one of several genera of agaric fungi (mushrooms) that were formerly classified in the genus Hydropus or Mycena. Mycopan is currently monotypic, containing the single species Mycopan scabripes. It produces dusky colored fruit bodies that are mycenoid, but lack amyloid or dextrinoid tissues except for the amyloid basidiospores. Its stipe is notably scruffy from cystidioid end cells and unlike true Hydropus it does not bleed clear fluid. Phylogenetically, Mycopan is distant from the Mycenaceae and the type of that family, Mycena, and it is not with the type of Hydropus, Hydropus fuliginarius.  Mycopan grouped closest to Baeospora. Baeospora was shown to be in the Cyphellaceae by Matheny and colleagues. Mycopan scabripes grows from debris in forest floors in North America and Europe.

Etymology

The name Mycopan alludes to a fungal (myco-) version of Pan and his furry legs and woodland home.

See also
List of Agaricales genera

References

External links
 AH Smith N.A. Mycena - Mycena scabripes
 MycoQuebec - Hydropus scabripes

Agaricales genera
Porotheleaceae
Fungi of Europe
Fungi of North America